General Secondary Education in Cyprus is a six-year educational program for students between the ages of 12 and 18. The Upper cycle of the Public Secondary General Education offers a three-year program for older students between the ages of 15 and 18.

It is made up of the Gymnasium (school) (Lower Secondary School), where the main concentration is a general humanistic education. Education is compulsory until the age of 15. From there students attend the Lykeio/Lyceum (Upper Secondary School), a more flexible educational system which offers various specializations depending on the inclinations, skills and interests of the students. Technical and vocational tracks are available.

Schedule
The school year runs from September 10 to May 20. Students attend classes Monday through Friday, from 7:30 AM to 1:35 PM. Breaks occur  at 9:00 a.m. for 15 minutes, at 10:45 a.m. for 25 minutes and at 12:40 p.m. for 10 minutes. Periods are 45 minutes in length and students have 35 periods each week.

School Holidays are October 1, October 28, December 23 until January 6, January 30, March 25, April 1, May 1, Good Monday (the Friday after Easter Week), Holy Spirit, Green Monday and the Summer holidays from June to September.

Certification of secondary education
 Unified Lyceum: An indicative certificate (for those who successfully complete grades A and B) or a School Leaving Certificate (APOLYTERION), for those who graduate, is awarded at the end of the school year to all successful students. The School Leaving Certificate is a qualification for employment in office work.
 Secondary Technical and Vocational Education: After successfully completing the program, students of TVE are awarded a School Leaving Certificate (APOLYTERION), which is recognized as equivalent to a School Leaving Certificate of a public three-grade Upper - Secondary school.

Clubs 
The Unified Lyceum Program "Action – Creativity – Social Contribution" (ACS) is organized by the school and is approved by the Ministry of Education and Culture. The program is compulsory for all students and is a prerequisite to successful completion of each grade and for obtaining a school leaving certificate. The activities that have been organized by schools so far, are now regulated, enriched and upgraded through this program.

Uniforms
Uniforms are compulsory.  The uniform consists of grey trousers or jeans for boys, grey skirts or jeans for girls and white, black or grey T-shirts.  A special uniform is required for PE classes.

Costs
Secondary education in Cyprus is free for all students.

Private lessons
Private lessons in Cyprus are very common. Almost all students prepare for external exams, usually GCE A´ and O´ Levels through private tuition, to ensure access to foreign universities, especially in the UK. Many students, especially in Lyceum, take private lessons for difficult subjects.

Access to higher education
Access to Public Tertiary Institutions in Cyprus and Greece can be achieved through the National Entrance exams, while the School Leaving Certificate can ensure access to private tertiary institutions.

See also
 Education in Cyprus
 List of schools in Cyprus

References 

Education in Cyprus